Diaphantania candacalis is a moth in the family Crambidae. It was described by Cajetan Felder, Rudolf Felder and Alois Friedrich Rogenhofer in 1875. It is found in the Dominican Republic and Puerto Rico.

References

Moths described in 1875
Spilomelinae
Taxa named by Baron Cajetan von Felder
Taxa named by Rudolf Felder